Vasantham K.Karthikeyan is a politician in the Viluppuram district in the Indian state of Tamil Nadu. He was selected as a member of legislative assembly from Rishivanthiyam in 2016, representing the D.M.K Party.

Early life 
Karthikeyan was born at Santhnur Village in 1978.karthikeyans parents were kannan and gandimathi

14th Assemby election 
In 2016 TN assembly elections, He got 92,607 votes and again become MLA by defeating AIADMK Candidate K. Dhandapani by a margin of 20,503 votes.
After Ekal M. Natesa Udayar, he is the D.M.K. Party's MLA from Rishivanthiyam.

COVID-19 
In 2020 the whole family of Vasantham Karthikeyan was affected by coronavirus.

15th Assembly election 

In 2021 TN assembly elections, He got 113,912 votes and again become MLA by defeating AIADMK candidate SKTC Santhosh by a margin of 41,729 votes.

References 
COVID-19 https://www.newindianexpress.com/states/tamil-nadu/2020/jun/22/vasantham-k-karthikeyan-becomes-second-dmk-mla-to-test-positive-for-covid-19-2159592.html

Members of the Tamil Nadu Legislative Assembly
People from Viluppuram district
Living people
Year of birth missing (living people)